Masha is a 2020 Russian thriller drama film directed by Anastasiya Palchikova. It is scheduled to be theatrically released on 1 April 2021. The film took part in the competition program of the Kinotavr festival and won the prize for "Best Debut".

Plot 
The film tells about a young girl named Masha and her hooligan friends. They love and protect her, and she sings jazz to them. And suddenly the cruel truth about them is revealed to her.

Cast 
 Anna Chipovskaya as adult Masha
 Polina Gukhman as little Masha
 Maksim Sukhanov as uncle
 Sergey Dvoynikov as Treshka
 Iris Lebedeva as Lena
 Aleksandr Mizev as Andrey

References

External links 
 

2020 films
2020s Russian-language films
Russian thriller drama films
Mars Media films
2020 thriller drama films